Sweden women's national sevens team represents Sweden in Rugby sevens. They competed at the 2019 Rugby Europe Women's Sevens Olympic Qualifying Tournament in Kazan, Russia. They finished ninth overall and did not qualify for Tokyo 2020. Sweden placed third at the 2021 Rugby Europe Women's Sevens Trophy in Zagreb, Croatia.

Players

Previous squads 
12 member Squad to European Women's Sevens Series: June 16–17, 2012 at Ameland, Netherlands 
Kerstin Lövendahl 
Sara Sundström 
Jessica Melin
Erika Andersson
Rebecka Kearney
Ninni Geibat Johansson
Amanda Sandsborg
Elisabeth Ygge
Jennifer Lindholm
Emilia Kristiansson
Hanna Engdahl
Johanna Norberg

References

External links
  Swedish Rugby Union Official Site

Women's national rugby sevens teams
R